North Erradale is a remote coastal crofting village on the western coast of Ross-shire, Scottish Highlands and is in the Scottish council area of Highland.

The villages of Melvaig lies 4 miles to the north, along the coast road, with the village of Big Sand lying directly south. Gairloch lies 4–5 miles to the southeast. The village dates back to the early 19th century, having houses dating back to the 1920s. It lies beside the Gairloch coast where there are many caves and ancient rocks.

References

Populated places in Ross and Cromarty